Michael Sageder (born 27 April 1959) is an Austrian rower. He competed in the men's quadruple sculls event at the 1980 Summer Olympics.

References

1959 births
Living people
Austrian male rowers
Olympic rowers of Austria
Rowers at the 1980 Summer Olympics
Rowers from Linz